Nicolás Lapentti was the defending champion but did not compete that year.

Andy Roddick won in the final 6–3, 6–2 against Nikolay Davydenko.

Seeds
A champion seed is indicated in bold text while text in italics indicates the round in which that seed was eliminated.

Draw

External links
2003 International Raiffeisen Grand Prix Draw

Hypo Group Tennis International
2003 ATP Tour